Jardine Fleming was a Hong Kong–based investment bank founded in 1970 as a joint venture between Jardine Matheson and Robert Fleming & Co. It was acquired by JP Morgan Chase in 2000.

References

Investment banks in Hong Kong
Former investment banks
Jardine Matheson Group
2000 mergers and acquisitions